Transworld Associates is a communications company in Pakistan. Transworld Associates owns the 1,300 km submarine telecommunications cable linking the United Arab Emirates, Oman, and Pakistan. Transworld Associates is an Orascom Telecom Holding (SAE) of Egypt, Saif Holdings Limited (SHL), and the Omzest Group.

TW-1 is a 1,300 km submarine telecommunications cable linking the United Arab Emirates, Oman, and Pakistan. The cable was launched by Omantel and Transworld Associates along with the U.S.-based Tyco International. It is a DWDM system which is upgradeable to a capacity of 1.28 Tbit/s.

External links
 Tyco Telecommunications completes TWA-1 undersea cable system
 Transworld Associates

Telecommunications companies of Pakistan